The 150th Infantry Regiment (150e régiment d'infanterie or 150e RI) was an infantry regiment in the French Army. Also known as the Régiment de Bagatelle, it inherited the traditions of the short-lived 150th Demi-Brigade (1794 to 1796) and 150th Line Infantry Regiment (1813 to 1814). The latter was formed by Napoleon I on 12 January 1813 to fight in Germany, where it was decimated, finally disbanding at Arras on 21 July 1814. The final regiment with the numeral 150 was formed as 150th Infantry Regiment on 25 July 1887. This fought in both World Wars, forming part of 12th Infantry Division in May–June 1940 and holding the French sector of the perimeter around Dunkirk, buying time for the success of Operation Dynamo and only surrendering on the beach at Malo-les-Bains on 4 June.

The regiment was re-formed in the armée d'armistice at Agen on 31 August 1940, but this unit was disbanded on 28 November 1942. The Free French Forces also raised a battalion named 150th Infantry Regiment on 1 September 1944 at Verdun. The regiment was definitely re-formed using marching battalions from the Free French Forces in February 1945 and took part in the liberation of Royan. At the end of 1945 it was in Paris but the following year it was disbanded and another 150th Infantry Battalion formed at Verdun. This was sent to Morocco in 1947 before being disbanded on 1 January 1949. A final motorised infantry regiment was formed with the numeral 150 on 4 January 1963, becoming mechanised infantry twelve years later and finally being disbanded in 1990. The numeral was revived in 1990 for a reserve regiment, but this too was disbanded in 1996, ending the regiment's lineage.

Infantry regiments of France